Limos (Ancient Greek: Λιμός means 'starvation'), Roman Fames , is the "sad" goddess or god of starvation, hunger and famine in ancient Greek religion. They were opposed by Demeter, goddess of grain and the harvest with whom Ovid wrote Limos could never meet, and Plutus, the god of wealth and the bounty of rich harvests.

Family 
According to Hesiod's Theogony, Limos is the child of the goddess Eris ("Discord"), who was the daughter of Nyx ("Night"). Limos' siblings include Toil (Ponos), Forgetfulness (Lethe), Stories (Logoi), Lies (Pseudea), Oaths (Horkos), Quarrels (Neikea), Disputes (Amphillogiai), Manslaughters (Androktasiai),  Battles (Hysminai) and Wars (Makhai), Anarchy (Dysnomia), Pains (Algea), and Ruin (Ate).

 And hateful Eris bore painful Ponos ("Hardship"),
 Lethe ("Forgetfulness") and Limos ("Starvation") and the tearful Algea ("Pains"),
 Hysminai ("Battles"), Makhai ("Wars"), Phonoi ("Murders"), and Androktasiai ("Manslaughters");
 Neikea ("Quarrels"), Pseudea ("Lies"), Logoi ("Stories"), Amphillogiai ("Disputes")
 Dysnomia ("Anarchy") and Ate ("Ruin"), near one another,
 and Horkos ("Oath"), who most afflicts men on earth,
 Then willing swears a false oath.

Sex 
The gender of Limos is not consistent in surviving literature. The gender of Limos seems to have varied depending on dialect, as it was feminine in Doric Greek and masculine in Attic Greek, and accordingly was personified as a goddess in Sparta. In a temple of Apollo at Amyclae, near Sparta, Limos was presented with a woman's form. as she was in the temple of Athena Chalcioecus, in Sparta. Callimachus of Cyrene, who preserves one of the versions of Limos' only notable myth, has the deity as a male one. What the gender of this deity would be to Homer is indeterminable. The Roman poets, who wrote in Latin, used the feminine noun Fames.

Mythology

Sentinel of Hades 
In Virgil's Aeneid, Limos is one of a number of spirits and monsters said to stand at the entrance to the Underworld.  Seneca the Younger writes that she "lies with wasted jaw" by Cocytus, the Underworld river of lamentation.

Virgil's account 
Aeneas is guided by the Sibyl through the Underworld:They walked exploring the unpeopled night,Through Pluto's vacuous realms, and regions void,As when one's path in dreary woodlands windsBeneath a misty moon's deceiving ray,When Jove has mantled all his heaven in shade,And night seals up the beauty of the world.In the first courts and entrances of HellLuctus/ Penthus (Sorrows) and vengeful Curae (Cares) on couches lie:There sad Senectus/ Geras (Old Age) abides, Morbus/ Nosos (Diseases) pale,And Metus/ Deimos (Fear), and Fames/ Limos (Hunger), temptress to all crime;Egestas/ Aporia (Want), base and vile, and, two dread shapes to see,Labor/ Ponos (Bondage) and Letum/ Thanatos (Death): then Sopor/ Hypnos (Sleep), Death's next of kin;And Gaudia (Dreams of Guilty Joy). Death-dealing Bellum/ Polemos (War)Is ever at the doors, and hard therebyThe Eumenides'/ Furies' beds of steel, where wild-eyed Discordia/ Eris (Strife)Her snaky hair with blood-stained fillet binds.

Seneca's account 
The foul pool of Cocytus' sluggish stream lies here;here the vulture, there the dole-bringing owl utters its cry,and the sad omen of the gruesome screech-owl sounds.The leaves shudder, black with gloomy foliagewhere sluggish Sopor/ Hypnos (Sleep) clings to the overhanging yew,where sad Fames/ Limos (Hunger) lies with wasted jaws,and Pudor/ Aedos (Shame), too late, hides her guilt-burdened face.Metus/ Deimos (Dread) stalks there, gloomy Pavor/ Phobos (Fear) and gnashing Dolor/ Algos (Pain),sable Luctus/ Penthus (Grief), tottering Morbus/ Nosos (Disease)and iron-girt Bella/ Enyo (War); and last of all slowSenectus/ Geras (Old Age) supports his steps upon a staff.

King's punishment 
In Ovid's Metamorphoses, Limos is said to make her home in a freezing and gloomy wasteland at the farthest edge of Scythia, where the soil is barren and nothing grows.  Demeter seeks her opposite's help there after being angered by the Thessalian king Erysichthon, who cut down a grove that was sacred to the goddess. By way of an oread nymph (as the two can never meet in person), Demeter bids Limos curse Erysichthon with never-ending hunger. The nymph beholds the fearsome spirit in a stony field:Her hair was coarse, her face sallow, her eyes sunken; her lips crusted and white; her throat scaly with scurf. Her parchment skin revealed the bowels within; beneath her hollow loins jutted her withered hips; her sagging breasts seemed hardly fastened to her ribs; her stomach only a void; her joints wasted and huge, her knees like balls, her ankles grossly swollen. Limos does as Demeter commands; at midnight she enters Erysichthon's chamber, wraps the king in her arms and breathes upon him, "filling with herself his mouth and throat and lungs, and [channeling] through his hollow veins her craving emptiness".  Thereafter, Erysichthon is filled with an unquenchable hunger which ultimately drives him to eat himself.

Notes

References 
 Caldwell, Richard, Hesiod's Theogony, Focus Publishing/R. Pullins Company (June 1, 1987). .
 Callimachus, Hymn to Demeter edited with an introduction and commentary by N. Hopkinson, Cambridge University Press, 1984, .
 Hesiod, Theogony from The Homeric Hymns and Homerica with an English Translation by Hugh G. Evelyn-White, Cambridge, MA.,Harvard University Press; London, William Heinemann Ltd. 1914. Online version at the Perseus Digital Library. Greek text available from the same website.
 Hodkinson, Stephen, and Anton Powell. 1999. Sparta: new perspectives. London: Duckworth. .
 Kilarski, Marcin, Nominal Classification: A History of its Study From the Classical pPeriod to the Present, John Benjamins Publishing Company, 2013, .
 Lucius Annaeus Seneca, Tragedies. Translated by Miller, Frank Justus. Loeb Classical Library Volumes. Cambridge, MA, Harvard University Press; London, William Heinemann Ltd. 1917. Online version at theio.com.
 Lucius Annaeus Seneca, Tragoediae. Rudolf Peiper. Gustav Richter. Leipzig. Teubner. 1921. Latin text available at the Perseus Digital Library.
 Publius Ovidius Naso, Metamorphoses translated by Brookes More (1859-1942). Boston, Cornhill Publishing Co. 1922. Online version at the Perseus Digital Library.
 Publius Ovidius Naso, Metamorphoses. Hugo Magnus. Gotha (Germany). Friedr. Andr. Perthes. 1892. Latin text available at the Perseus Digital Library.
 Publius Vergilius Maro, Aeneid. Theodore C. Williams. trans. Boston. Houghton Mifflin Co. 1910. Online version at the Perseus Digital Library.
 Publius Vergilius Maro, Bucolics, Aeneid, and Georgics. J. B. Greenough. Boston. Ginn & Co. 1900. Latin text available at the Perseus Digital Library.
 West, Martin, ''Theogony: Edited with Prolegomena and Commentary by M. L. West, 1966, Clarendon Press.

External links 

 LIMOS from the Theoi Project

Greek goddesses
Personifications in Greek mythology
Metamorphoses characters
Greek gods
Deeds of Demeter
Children of Eris (mythology)
Starvation